Tia Lee Nelson (born June 21, 1956) is an American academic, environmental activist, and public servant from the state of Wisconsin. She has held several high-profile positions at The Nature Conservancy, served as Executive Secretary of the Wisconsin Board of Commissioners of Public Lands, and is currently Managing Director of the Climate program at the Outrider Foundation. Nelson is the daughter of former United States Senator and Governor Gaylord Nelson, the founder of Earth Day.

Early life 
Nelson was born on June 21, 1956 in the Crestwood neighborhood of Madison, Wisconsin. She was two years old when her father was elected Governor of Wisconsin. She lived in the Executive Residence (Governor's Mansion) in Maple Bluff, Wisconsin until the age of six, when her father was elected to United States Senate. She spent her upbringing in Washington, D.C. until graduating from high school and returning to Wisconsin to attend college. Nelson often accompanied her father during campaign stops throughout his political career.

Career
After graduating from UW–Madison's school of wildlife ecology and clerking for the Wisconsin Assembly Committee on Natural Resources, Nelson joined The Nature Conservancy as legislative liaison for government relations. She spent 17 years with the organization, also holding posts as a senior policy advisor for the Latin America and Caribbean Division and then, as the first director of the Conservancy's Global Climate Change Initiative. During her time with the group, Nelson worked in more than 25 countries, and was in Rio de Janeiro in 1992 when President George H.W. Bush signed the United Nations Framework Convention on Climate Change at the Earth Summit, the U.S. commitment to help fight global warming.

While at The Nature Conservancy, Nelson advocated for forest protection and restoration as a critical climate change mitigation strategy and an essential component of public policies to address global warming. She led the development of pilot carbon sequestration projects in Belize, Bolivia, and Brazil, where she helped create standards for the measurement and verification of the greenhouse gas benefits of conservation and improved timber management. The Rio Bravo project in Belize was the first one of its kind in the world to be certified by the U.S. Initiative on Joint Implementation, and earned her the Climate Protection Award in 2000 from the Environmental Protection Agency.

In 2004, Nelson returned home to Wisconsin to serve as Executive Secretary to the Wisconsin Board of Commissioners of Public Lands (BCPL), which included an appointment in 2007 as co‐chair of Wisconsin's Task Force on Global Warming. In July 2005, Nelson spoke at her father's memorial service which was held at the Wisconsin Capitol Building. Nelson introduced Michelle Obama during a rally before the 2008 presidential primary in Wisconsin. In 2009, Nelson testified before the U.S. House Energy and Commerce Committee regarding the American Clean Energy and Security Act. The legislation would have cut carbon dioxide and other greenhouse gases by 20 percent by 2020 and by 83 percent by mid-century.

While serving as Executive Secretary to the BCPL, Nelson was ordered to never discuss climate change on state time by two of the three board members—the Attorney General and the State Treasurer. The Attorney General later changed his position on the "gag" order and went on to express strong support for Nelson's job performance in a letter released to the press. Nelson left her post at the state agency in 2015 and is currently the Managing Director of the Climate program at the Outrider Foundation, a Madison, Wisconsin group which works to end the threat of a nuclear war and reverse global climate change. Nelson introduced U.S. Senator Bernie Sanders at an October 2016 Madison rally for Democratic presidential candidate Hillary Clinton. Nelson voiced her support for Clinton and U.S. Senate Candidate Russ Feingold based on their advocacy for clean energy policies.

Other roles
 Through the UW-Madison Nelson Institute and Wisconsin Historical Society, Nelson helped launch www.nelsonearthday.net, a site which houses the Gaylord Nelson Collection.
 Nelson is a trustee emeritus at the Northland College Board and has served on the boards of the Earth Day Network, Gathering Waters Conservancy, Cool Choices, and the Friends of the Apostle Islands.
 She is also an emeritus board member of the UW-Madison Nelson Institute of Environmental Studies Board of Visitors.
Nelson is a member of the ecoAmerica Board of Directors.
 Nelson has served as an advisor to several councils including the World Bank's Bio Carbon Fund, the Chicago Climate Exchange, and the Climate Neutral Network.

Awards 

 2000: Climate Protection Award by the United States Environmental Protection Agency.
 2006: The Environmental Lifetime Achievement Award by Keep Greater Milwaukee Beautiful.
 2012: David Engleson Award by Wisconsin Association for Environmental Education.
 2015: Environmental Leader Award by the University of Wisconsin-Stevens Point.

References

External links
Official

 Outrider Foundation
 
Tia Nelson on Twitter

Articles

Articles on LinkedIn.
 Nelson: It's time to renew Earth Day's bipartisan commitment to a clean and healthy environment on Milwaukee Journal Sentinel.

Interviews, speeches, and statements

A Conversation with Tia Nelson on Wisconsin Department of Natural Resources.
A message from Tia Nelson on Earth Day on YouTube. Promotional for Senator Tammy Baldwin.
 
 Features on Wisconsin Public Radio (WPR)
 Tia Nelson - March for Science Madison - April 22, 2017 on YouTube.
 Tia Nelson Talks About Earth Day And The Environment on WXPR based in Rhinelander, Wisconsin.

Media Coverage

Mentions in The New York Times
Scientific Method on Isthmus magazine based in Madison, Wisconsin.
Mentions in Scientific American
Republicans try to prevent Wisconsin official working on climate change in The Guardian
Articles and mentions in The Capital Times based in Madison, Wisconsin.

Other

 The Fall of Wisconsin by Dan Kaufman
 When The Earth Moves

1956 births
21st-century American politicians
American environmentalists
American women environmentalists
University of Wisconsin–Madison alumni
Living people
Wisconsin Democrats
Women in Wisconsin politics
Lesbian politicians
LGBT people from Wisconsin
Politicians from Madison, Wisconsin
People from Maple Bluff, Wisconsin
21st-century American women politicians